The Power Macintosh 7600 is a personal computer designed, manufactured and sold by Apple Computer from April 1996 to November 1997. It is identical to the Power Macintosh 7500, but with a PowerPC 604 CPU. Three models were available with 120 MHz, 132 MHz and 200 MHz processors. Like the 7500, it includes advanced Audio-Video ports including RCA audio in and out, S-Video in, composite video in and standard Apple video ports. The 7600 features the easy-access "outrigger" desktop case first introduced with the Power Macintosh 7500.
It was eventually replaced by the Power Macintosh 7300, one of the very few times that Apple updated a computer but gave it a lower model number - the reason is that the 7300 was a joint replacement for the 7600 and the Power Macintosh 7200.

Models 
Introduced April 22, 1996:
 Power Macintosh 7600/120

Introduced August 3, 1996:
 Power Macintosh 7600/132

Introduced February 2, 1997:
 Power Macintosh 7600/200: Sold in Japan only.

Timeline

References

External links 
 Power Mac 7600 at lowendmac.com
 7600/120, 7600/132 and 7600/200 at everymac.com

7600
7600
Macintosh desktops
Computer-related introductions in 1996